Rihyon Airport (a.k.a. Ihyon Airport) is an airport used for military purposes in Ryulla-ri,Sinwon County, Hwanghae-namdo, North Korea.

Facilities 
The airfield has a single grass runway 09/27 measuring 3530 x 262 feet (1076 x 80 m).  It is sited in a river valley.

References 

Airports in North Korea
South Hwanghae